Hans Johnny Höglin (born 26 February 1943) is a Swedish speed skater whose greatest moment was to win a gold medal in the 10000-meter event at the 1968 Winter Olympics in Grenoble, France.

Höglin was a surprise winner, having never placed higher than 10th in the European or World Championships, and having finished fifth in the 1500 and 5000-meter races at the 1968 Olympics. He nevertheless edged favorite Fred Anton Maier by 0.3 seconds to win the 10000 meters.

At the 1972 Winter Olympics, Höglin finished 9th in the 1500 meters and 12th in the 5000 meters.

Höglin's younger brother Urban, along with Urban's fiancée Heidi Paakkonen, was murdered while touring New Zealand in 1989.

References

External links
Profile at SkateResults.com

1943 births
Swedish male speed skaters
Speed skaters at the 1968 Winter Olympics
Speed skaters at the 1972 Winter Olympics
Olympic speed skaters of Sweden
Medalists at the 1968 Winter Olympics
Olympic medalists in speed skating
Olympic gold medalists for Sweden
People from Filipstad Municipality
Living people
Sportspeople from Värmland County
20th-century Swedish people